Reggina Calcio were relegated following losing three key players in the summer of 2000. Despite goalkeeper Massimo Taibi being in full form following his Manchester United debacle, Reggina had serious goal scoring problems without departed striker Mohamed Kallon. With Davide Dionigi arriving from Sampdoria mid-season, Reggina solved that problem, and Dionigi's six goals led to a spareggio for the Serie A stay, a double-header Reggina lost. Coach Franco Colomba was not blamed for the relegation, and was given the all-clear to stay for a further season, with Reggina one of the favourites to bounce back to the top domestic division.

Squad

Goalkeepers
  Massimo Taibi
  Emanuele Belardi
  Antonio Castelli

Defenders
  Martin Jiránek
  Luca Mezzano
  Marco Caneira
  Giovanni Morabito
  Joseph Dayo Oshadogan
  Lorenzo Stovini

Midfielders
  Andrea Zanchetta
  José Mamede
  Francesco Cozza
  Jorge Vargas
  Paulo Costa
  Salvatore Vicari
  Ezio Brevi
  Andrea Bernini
  Ricardo Verón
  Mozart

Attackers
  Erjon Bogdani
  Davide Dionigi
  Davide Possanzini
  Maurizio Nassi
  Massimo Marazzina

Serie A

Matches

Relegation tie-breaker

Topscorers
  Davide Dionigi 6
  Andrea Zanchetta 5
  Francesco Cozza 5
  Massimo Marazzina 4

References

Sources
  RSSSF - Italy 2000/01

Reggina 1914 seasons
Reggina